Dickman is a surname. Notable people with the surname include:

Emerson Dickman (1914–1981), relief pitcher in Major League Baseball who played his entire career for the Boston Red Sox
Franklin J. Dickman (1828–1908), Republican politician in the U.S. State of Ohio, Ohio Supreme Court Judge 1886–1895
James B. Dickman born in 1949, an American photographer, won the 1983 Pulitzer Prize for feature photography
Jill Dickman, Republican member of the Nevada Assembly
John Dickman (1864–1910), Englishman hanged for murder
Jonjo Dickman (born 1981), English football midfielder
Joseph T. Dickman (1857–1927), United States Army general
Matthew Dickman (born 1975), American poet
Michael Dickman (born 1975), American poet

See also
A. P. Dickman House, historic home in Ruskin, Florida, United States
Caparo Industries plc v Dickman, leading English tort law case on the test for a duty of care
Dickman function ρ is a special function used to estimate the proportion of smooth numbers up to a given bound
Golomb–Dickman constant arises in the theory of random permutations and in number theory
USS Joseph T. Dickman (APA-13), Harris-class attack transport that served with the US Navy during World War II
Dickmann (surname)